The 2014 Thomas & Uber Cup was the 28th tournament of the Thomas Cup and 25th tournament of the Uber Cup, the badminton team championships for men and women respectively. It was held on 18–25 May 2014 at the Siri Fort Sports Complex in New Delhi, India. This is the first time India hosted the two cups.

The Thomas Cup final featured two teams not expected to make it there as Japan faced Malaysia. In a back-and-forth contest, Japan came out on top by a score of 3 matches to 2, winning their first Thomas Cup. The Uber Cup final featured the top two teams, China and Japan. Backed by wins from the world's top two singles players, China came out on top by a 3–1 score. It was their 13th title overall.

Host city selection
New Delhi was awarded with this event by Badminton World Federation in April 2013. This event marked the first time India hosted the Thomas and Uber Cup finals after hosting 2009 BWF World Championships in Hyderabad.

Qualifiers

Seedings
The seeding list was based on 6 March 2014 world rankings as the draw was conducted on 30 March 2014. The top four seeded teams were in the first pot, followed by the next four teams in the second pot, the next four teams in the third pot, and the last four teams were in the fourth pot.

The knock out draw was held immediately after the group stage was completed.

Thomas Cup

Uber Cup

Squads

Thomas Cup

Groups

Group A

Group B

Group C

Group D

Knockout stage
All times are India Standard Time (UTC+05:30).

Quarterfinals

Semifinals

The top four teams in the semi-final were the top four seeded teams in this competition. They also won their respective groups.

Final
Both Japan and Malaysia arrived in the final having already surpassed expectations by defeating traditional powerhouses China and Indonesia in the semi-final, both with 3–0 scores.

In the first singles matches, Malaysia's world number one Lee Chong Wei defeated Japan's Kenichi Tago in straight sets. In the next match, Malaysia's scratch combination of Hoon Thien How and Tan Boon Heong won the first set, but Japan's world number three pair of Kenichi Hayakawa and Hiroyuki Endo stayed close and pipped their opponent to win the match. In the second singles match, upcoming Japanese player Kento Momota bested Chong Wei Feng in straight sets. The second doubles match was perhaps the most explosive, with quick volleys, many powerful smashes, and several diving saves. In the end, Malaysia's doubles team of Goh V Shem and Tan Wee Kiong stayed unbeaten during the tournament and leveled the best of five contest by defeating Japan's Keigo Sonoda and Takeshi Kamura in three sets. Thus, the hopes of both countries fell to the third singles players. Malaysia's Daren Liew got out to an early lead, but as the game progressed he made a couple of errors, misjudging the shuttle. Japan's Takuma Ueda won the match in three sets, giving Japan their first title.

Uber Cup

Groups

Group W

Group X

Group Y

Group Z

Knockout stage

Quarterfinals

Semifinals

Three of the teams in the semi-final were among the top four seeded teams in this competition. The other team is host India. All four teams won their respective groups.

Final
China and Japan were the top two seeded teams in the Uber Cup and faced each other in the final.

Olympic champion and world number one Li Xuerui quickly defeated her Japanese opponent Minatsu Mitani in straight sets. Japan evened the contest in the first doubles when Misaki Matsutomo and Ayaka Takahashi stopped China's top women pair, Bao Yixin and Tang Jinhua, in straight sets. World number two Wang Shixian put China back in front when she beat Japan's Sayaka Takahashi in another match that ended in straight sets. China clinched the title in the second doubles when Wang Xiaoli and Zhao Yunlei bested Miyuki Maeda and Reika Kakiiwa. China thus won the tie three matches to one.

References

External links
BWF Thomas & Uber Cups 2014 at tournamentsoftware.com

 
International sports competitions hosted by India
Thomas
Thomas and Uber Cup
Thomas and Uber Cup
Sport in New Delhi
Badminton tournaments in India
Thomas & Uber Cup